Montfortula is a genus of keyhole limpets, marine gastropod molluscs in the subfamily Emarginulinae of the family Fissurellidae.

Species
, species within the genus Montfortula include:
 Montfortula brevirimata (Deshayes, 1862)
 Montfortula chathamensis Finlay, 1928
 Montfortula fujitai (Habe, 1953)
 Montfortula kaawaensis (Bartrum, 1919)
 Montfortula punctata (A. Adams, 1852)
 Montfortula rugosa (Quoy & Gaimard, 1834)
 Montfortula variegata (A. Adams, 1852)
Species brought into synonymy
 Montfortula lyallensis Mestayer, 1928: synonym of Montfortula rugosa (Quoy & Gaimard, 1834)
 Montfortula picta (Dunker, 1860): synonym of Montfortia picta (Dunker, 1860)
 Montfortula pulchra (Adams, 1852): synonym of Montfortia pulchra (A. Adams, 1852)

References

 Powell A. W. B., New Zealand Mollusca, William Collins Publishers Ltd, Auckland, New Zealand 1979 

Fissurellidae
Gastropods of Australia
Gastropods of New Zealand